Jakie Kim Wellman (also Matana Wellman, born July 22, 1988) is a Zambian swimmer, who specialized in sprint freestyle events. She is a high school graduate of Kelly College in Devon, England, and a member of the swimming team for the Missouri State Bears, while attending the Missouri State University in Springfield, Missouri, United States.

Wellman qualified for the women's 50 m freestyle, as a 16-year-old, at the 2004 Summer Olympics in Athens, by receiving a Universality place from FINA, in an entry time of 28.39. Swimming in heat four, she raced to fourth place by 0.13 of a second behind Aruba's Roshendra Vrolijk in 28.56. Wellman failed to advance into the semifinals, as she placed fiftieth overall out of 75 swimmers on the last day of preliminaries.

References

External links
Player Bio – Missouri State Bears 

1988 births
Living people
Olympic swimmers of Zambia
Swimmers at the 2004 Summer Olympics
Commonwealth Games competitors for Zambia
Swimmers at the 2006 Commonwealth Games
Zambian female freestyle swimmers
Missouri State Lady Bears swimmers
Sportspeople from Lusaka